Kaar Narpathu (Tamil: கார் நாற்பது) is a Tamil poetic work belonging to the Eighteen Lesser Texts (Pathinenkilkanakku) anthology of Tamil literature. This belongs to the 'post Sangam period' corresponding to between 100 – 500 CE. Kar Narpathu contains forty poems written by the poet Kannankoothanaar, who lived in Madurai.

The poems of Kaar Narpathu deal with the agam (internal) subjects. Agam in the Sangam literature denotes the subject matters that deal with the intangibles of life such as human emotions, love, separation, lovers' quarrels, etc. Most of the poems of Kar Narpathu are in the form of the heroine being consoled by her friend by describing the beauties of the rainy season (the Tamil word Kaar means rain).

References

 Mudaliyar, Singaravelu A., Apithana Cintamani, An encyclopaedia of Tamil Literature, (1931) - Reprinted by Asian Educational Services, New Delhi (1983)
 http://tamilnation.org/literature/pathinen/pm0029.pdf Kar Narpathu eText at Project madurai

Sangam literature